Robert Marionneaux Jr. is/was an American politician who served District 17 in the Louisiana Senate from 2000 to 2012 and the Louisiana House of Representatives from 1996 to 2000 as a Democrat.

References

1968 births
Living people
Politicians from Baton Rouge, Louisiana
People from Iberville Parish, Louisiana
Louisiana lawyers
Ranchers from Louisiana
Democratic Party Louisiana state senators
Democratic Party members of the Louisiana House of Representatives
Louisiana State University alumni
Southern University alumni